Smithboro is an unincorporated community in Reynolds County, in the U.S. state of Missouri.

History
A post office called Smithboro was established in 1901, and remained in operation until 1909. The community has the name of one Mr. Smith, a first settler.

References

Unincorporated communities in Reynolds County, Missouri
Unincorporated communities in Missouri